John Punnett Peters (December 4, 1887 – December 29, 1955) was an American chemist and "one of the founders of modern clinical chemistry". His 1932 textbook Quantitative Clinical Chemistry, coauthored with Donald Van Slyke, established clinical chemistry as a distinct discipline. His research articles and textbooks advanced the laboratory in the diagnosis and management of disease.

Peters was born in Philadelpia. He spent much of his growing up years in New York City. He did his undergraduate education at Yale University and earned his medical degree at Columbia University. During World War I her served as a medical doctor in the US army.

References

External links
 John Punnett Peters papers (MS 897). Manuscripts and Archives, Yale University Library. 

1887 births
1955 deaths
American biochemists
Clinical chemists
Yale University alumni
Columbia University Vagelos College of Physicians and Surgeons alumni